PDEng may stand for:
 Professional Doctorate in Engineering (PDEng), a postgraduate engineering title
 Professional Development for Engineering Students (PDEng), a program at the University of Waterloo for all undergraduate engineering students